The Wolf River is a river in northern Fiordland, New Zealand. It rises near Mount Sutherland and flows westward to Madagascar Beach, between Martins Bay and Milford Sound / Piopiotahi.

See also
List of rivers of New Zealand

References

Rivers of Fiordland